Trees for Life is a registered charity working to rewild the Scottish Highlands. 

The Caledonian Forest once covered a large area of the Highlands of Scotland as extensive stands of majestic Scots pine, interspersed with birch, rowan, juniper and aspen trees, but is now reduced to about 2% of its former extent. Through planting native species of trees, removing non-native species and fencing seedlings to protect them from overgrazing by deer and sheep, Trees for Life aims to help the natural regeneration of the forest. Its long-term goal is to create a fully restored, healthy ecosystem, with the reintroduction of missing species of wildlife, such as the beaver, wild boar, lynx and wolf.

The vast majority of its work is carried out by volunteers. By engaging people from diverse backgrounds, it aims to achieve a powerful and educational experience that will promote the work of restoration to wider audiences and lead to increased support for the return of the forest and its species.

History

Trees for Life was founded by Alan Watson Featherstone.
Practical work on the project began in 1989 and since then they have planted nearly 2 million native trees and have protected numerous areas with fenced exclosures.

Initial work took place in Glen Cannich, but the majority of their activities to date have been in Glen Affric, where they operate in partnership with both Forestry and Land Scotland and the National Trust for Scotland. Later, work expanded into other nearby glens, such as Glenmoriston, to the south of Glen Affric, at Achnashellach, and at Corrimony, where they worked in partnership with the Royal Society for the Protection of Birds.

Volunteer Conservation Weeks

Much of Trees for Life's practical work is carried out by volunteers, through their programme of volunteer Conservation Weeks, providing opportunities for people to get involved and support their efforts. Held throughout spring and autumn, each week consists of 10 volunteers, and is run by two leaders, who may be Trees for Life staff members or volunteers who have been trained to lead weeks themselves. Work carried out includes native tree planting, non-native species removal, seed collection, fencing and working in their Tree Nursery.

Conservation Weeks are held at varying locations across the Scottish Highlands, depending on work required.

Dundreggan Estate

In August 2008 Trees for Life purchased the 4,000 hectare Dundreggan Estate in Glenmoriston, in the Scottish Highlands – one of the largest areas of land in the UK to be bought for forest restoration. The £1.65 million deal is the charity's most significant and important project to date, and follows more than two years of negotiations.

Dundreggan, lying on the north side of Glenmoriston to the west of Loch Ness, is home to declining species such as black grouse and wood ants. It contains areas of ancient woodland, including one of Scotland's best areas of juniper as well as significant areas of dwarf birch; however, much of the estate is open treeless ground. It was previously managed as a traditional sporting estate for many years, and heavy grazing by sheep and deer has prevented the healthy growth of woodland and other natural habitats. Trees for Life's purchase of the estate will allow them to plant 500,000 native trees and re-connect the forest between Glen Moriston and Glen Affric.

By 2058, Trees for Life's long-term plan will see Dundreggan restored to a wild landscape of diverse natural forest cover, with the return of species including red squirrel, capercaillie, golden eagle and European beaver. Scientific research and education programmes will be established and most human infrastructure removed. Dundreggan Lodge and a neighbouring cottage will be renovated to a high ecological standard, providing a base for volunteers and educational displays for students, researchers and school children. After a feasibility study in Glen Affric six wild boar, donated by the Highland Wildlife Park, were re-introduced to a large fenced area of the estate in November 2009.

Woodland Ground Flora Project

Trees for Life's Woodland Ground Flora Project seeks to enhance populations of plants which have become scarce in established woodland, species such as one-flowered wintergreen (Moneses uniflora), and twinflower (Linnaea borealis), and to establish populations of these plants, and more common species such as primrose (Primula vulgaris) and bluebell (Hyacinthoides non-scripta), in new woodland where these species are absent.

The project involves surveys of established and new woodland sites, creating trial plots for species reintroduction, propagation of plants, researching suitable species and their growing conditions and liaising with other organisations involved in similar work.

See also

 Trees For Life (Australia) – an unaffiliated charity that also engages volunteers for environmental restoration

References

External links

 
 Restoring the Earth
 Trees for Life volunteer's site

Rural Scotland
Charities based in Scotland
1989 establishments in Scotland
Findhorn community
Nature conservation in Scotland
Nature conservation organisations based in the United Kingdom
Environmental organisations based in Scotland
Forestry in Scotland